Marion Herbert Hoover (known as M. Herbert Hoover or Herbert Hoover) (Born  Ashville, Ohio; died 1952) of Akron, Ohio, was an American politician of the Republican party who ran unsuccessfully for a number of elective offices in Ohio. In 1944, Hoover was the Republican nominee in the election for Lieutenant Governor of Ohio.

Despite his name, he was not related to Herbert Hoover, the President of the United States from 1929 to 1933. Starting with the 1940 campaign, he dropped his first initial for campaign purposes, calling himself only "Herbert Hoover".

Unsuccessful standings

In 1925, Hoover lost a race for a seat on the Akron city council. 
In 1926, he declared his intention to run for Ohio State Treasurer, but failed to get the Republican nomination.
In 1934 and 1936, Hoover ran for an at-large seat in the United States House of Representatives but lost in the Republican party primary. From 1937 to 1938, Hoover worked as an inspector for the Ohio liquor control department. 
In 1938, he again failed to get his party's nomination for Ohio State Treasurer.
From 1939 to 1940, Hoover worked as an examiner for Ohio's Department of Taxation. In 1940, Hoover unsuccessfully ran for Ohio State Auditor. 
In 1942, Hoover was working for a pension office. He lost his job when he failed to sit for the civil service examination. Hoover attempted to unseat his fellow Republican, the incumbent Governor of Ohio John W. Bricker, by entering the Republican primary. However, Hoover's petitions failed to meet state election standards when many of the signatures were ruled unacceptable. It is rumoured that Hoover challenged the popular, four-term incumbent in retaliation for the civil service rules that had cost him his pension office job. 
By 1944, Hoover had moved to Columbus, Ohio, and that year he won the Republican nomination for Lieutenant Governor of Ohio, but he lost in the general election. In 1946, he failed to get the Republican nomination for Ohio Secretary of State.

External links
 Election Results, Ohio Lieutenant Governor

Politicians from Akron, Ohio
Year of birth missing
1952 deaths
Ohio Republicans